Southeast Raleigh Magnet High School is a magnet high school in Raleigh, North Carolina, United States. It opened in 1997 as a magnet school with a focus on math, science, and technology. The current magnet theme is University Connections, which focuses on providing students with interactions and experiences with colleges, universities, and workplace environments while still in high school.  The school operates on a modified calendar, with the fall semester usually starting in late July and with longer, more frequent breaks during the school year, completing classes before the end of May.

History
In February 1994 Wake County officials asked the Wake County School Board to provide a school for the southeastern area of Raleigh; its teaching should focus on math, science, and technology. On July 28, 1997, the school opened for grades 9 to 12, with an initial student population of 1100. Beginning with the 2004–2005 school year, the school changed its name to Southeast Raleigh Magnet High School: Center for Leadership and Technology. The name change came with a new initiative on the part of former principal John Modest to encourage students through school activities to develop strong leadership skills.  In 2018, the school changed its magnet focus again to University Connections.

Since its opening many concepts pioneered at Southeast Raleigh Magnet High School have been implemented throughout Wake County, including block scheduling and senior graduation projects.

Students
In the school year 2006/2007, the school had a total population of 1,866 students. Southeast Raleigh Magnet High School originally was built to serve 1,699 students, but has added 16 mobile units (trailers) to increase that number to 2,083. With the trailers, the school is at 89.6% of its full capacity. Students attend school from 7:25 AM to 2:30 PM, with four classes each semester. Some classes, such as Advanced Placement courses, marching band and upper-level chorus, also operate on "A" or "B" days, allowing semester-long classes to be stretched out over a year.

The school was featured on MTV's High School Stories for a student off-campus lunch pass forgery ring.

Administration
The school has been led by George "Eddie" Harden, a former assistant principal from North Mecklenburg High School, and former teacher at Southeast Raleigh, since 2020. He is the school's seventh principal.

Athletics 
The school's athletic teams are known as the Bulldogs and the school colors are navy blue and dark green.  They are members of the North Carolina High School Athletic Association and compete at the 4A level for all sports, classified as 4-single-A for the purposes of football playoffs.  They are members of the Cap 7 conference, all members of which are schools in Raleigh.  The school's football stadium is named for John H. Baker Jr., a former NFL player and Wake County Sheriff, and the school's basketball court is named after John Modest, the school's first principal.

Sports sponsored
Fall season
Cheerleading
Football
Women's volleyball
Cross country
Men's soccer
Women's golf
Women's gymnastics
Women's tennis
Winter season
Cheerleading
Indoor track
Swimming
Basketball
Wrestling
Spring season
Baseball
Softball
Men's golf
Men's lacrosse
Men's tennis
Women's soccer
Women's stunt

Notable alumni

 Darrius Barnes, professional soccer player in the MLS
 William Cashion, bassist of Future Islands
 Wayne Davis II, Olympic Hurdler who competed at the 2012 Summer Olympics
 Leroy Harris, NFL offensive guard
 Gabby Mayo, American sprinter
 Daniel McCullers, NFL defensive lineman
 Brian Simmons, Canadian Football League offensive tackle

References 

Public high schools in North Carolina
Schools in Raleigh, North Carolina
Magnet schools in North Carolina